Salignac-Eyvigues is a commune in the Dordogne department in Nouvelle-Aquitaine in southwestern France.

It includes the 17th century Eyrignac Manor, which has a remarkable garden, originally established in the 18th century, surrounding the manor house on a hill, with water coming from seven springs. Only a pavilion, fountains and basins remain from the original garden. In the 1960s, the new owner, Giles Sermadiras de Cuzols de Lile, created a new garden, inspired by gardens from the Renaissance and Italian gardens to the end of the 18th century. The garden features topiary sculptures, vistas, fountains, statues, and an avenue of vases.

Population

See also
Communes of the Dordogne department

References

Communes of Dordogne